Hassnain Abbas (born 15 October 1990) is a Pakistani footballer who plays as a midfielder for WAPDA.

Abbas appeared in 2012 AFC President's Cup, while playing for Khan Research Laboratories.

Honours
 Pakistan Premier League: 2011–12

References

Pakistani footballers
Pakistan international footballers
Living people
Association football midfielders
1990 births